Österreich is German for Austria

Osterreich, Österreiche, Oesterreich, or variant, may also refer to:

 Österreich (surname) or Oesterreich
 Österreich (newspaper), a national daily newspaper of Austria based in Vienna
 Österreich I, an Austrian TV show
 Österreich II, an Austrian TV show

See also

 Land Österreich
 Österreich-Ring
 Austria (disambiguation)